Lieutenant-General Sipho Binda  (13 July 1952 – 10 November 2006) was a South African military commander who served as Chief of the Joint Operations Division of the South African National Defence Force before his death on 10 November 2006.

His military career started in 1977 when he went into exile to join Umkhonto we Sizwe. He returned to South Africa and was arrested and imprisoned on Robben Island until his release in 1990.

He served as General Officer Commanding Logistics Support Formation and Force Commander for the AU mission in Burundi. He was appointed Chief of Joint Operations on 1 November 2004.

Awards and honours
Gen Binda has been awarded the following:

References

South African Army generals
1952 births
2006 deaths
Prisoners and detainees of South Africa
Place of birth missing
Road incident deaths in South Africa
Graduates of the Royal College of Defence Studies
UMkhonto we Sizwe personnel